Plaça de Lesseps is a square serving as the border between the Sarrià-Sant Gervasi and Gràcia district of Barcelona, Catalonia, Spain, loosely divided in two parts. One of the most heavily transited squares in the city, Lesseps is the starting point of one of Barcelona's busiest rondes: Ronda del General Mitre, as well as being the west end of Carrer Gran de Gràcia and being crossed by a number of streets, namely: Travessera de Dalt, Avinguda del Príncep d'Astúries, Avinguda de Vallcarca, Avinguda de la República Argentina, Carrer del Torrent de l'Olla, Carrer de la Mare de Déu del Coll, Carrer de Santa Perpètua, Carrer de Maignon and Carrer de Pérez Galdós.

A traditionally arbored spot of the city, it has seen heavy construction works for years to move the route of the aforementioned rondes, allowing the square to  become a more pedestrian-friendly place while easing the heavy traffic that crosses it on a daily basis. 

The square is named after Ferdinand de Lesseps, the developer of the Suez Canal. Earlier in his career, De Lesseps was the French consul in Barcelona. He is known in Barcelona for having intervened against the 1842 bombing of the city ordered by General Baldomero Espartero and Captain-General Juan Van Halen. Before 1895 the square had been known as Josepets, after the 1626 convent of Santa Maria de Gràcia, also known as Els Josepets", which remained a popular name for the square, although now outdated.

Culture
Jaume Fuster library, inaugurated in 2006.

Education

Schools
Col·legi d'Educació Infantil i Primària Rius i Taulet
Aula de Formació d'Adults Rius i Taulet

Other
Residència Universitària Lesseps

Religion
Parròquia de la Verge de Gràcia i Sant Josep, a Catholic church.

Transport

Metro
Lesseps metro station, one of the city's oldest metro stations, served by L3. It's expected to be served by L9 in the future.

Bus
The following bus routes reach Plaça de Lesseps:
Line 22 Pl. Catalunya - Ctra. Esplugues
Line 24 Av. Paral·lel - Carmel
Line 28 Pl. Catalunya - Carmel
Line 31 Hospital Clínic - Canyelles
Line 32 Estació de Sants - Roquetes
Line 74 Zona Universitària - Fabra i Puig
Line 87 Pg. Maragall - Travessera de Gràcia
Line 92 Pg. Marítim - Gràcia
Line 116 Gràcia - La Salut
Tibibus

Night bus
Line N4 Via Favència - Pl. Catalunya - Gran Vista

See also
Gràcia
List of streets and squares in Gràcia
Urban planning of Barcelona

References

External links
Location at the official interactive guide of Barcelona
Photos at Bcn.cat
Project at the urbanism section of the official city council website (Bcn.cat
About the L9 station
Associació de Veïns i Comerciants de la Plaça Lesseps (in Catalan)
Lesseps Square (Barcelona) through maps. The evolution of urban space (in Catalan)

Plazas in Barcelona
Gràcia
Sarrià-Sant Gervasi